The Manager in Distress is a 1780 comedy play by George Colman the Elder. It was  written to open the summer season at the Haymarket Theatre on 30 April 1780. A theatre manager learns that his actors have all left him, meaning he has to cancel his season of plays, only for them to turn up after all. The play is full of in-jokes including references to Colman himself.

References

Bibliography
 Smith, Dane Farnsworth. Plays about the Theatre in England, 1737-1800: or, The Self-conscious Stage from Foote to Sheridan. Associated University Presses, 1979.

Plays by George Colman the Elder
1780 plays